Ovington is a civil parish in the English county of Norfolk.
It is in the district of Breckland.

The villages name means 'Farm/settlement connected with Ufa'.

Clubs
The long established ladies' group, gardener's and bowls clubs are active in Ovington. More recently an Allotment Association has been formed cultivating land behind the church.

Fairs
Ovington holds a Christmas Bazaar in the Village Hall and a summer fete in the grounds surrounding the hall.

References

http://kepn.nottingham.ac.uk/map/place/Norfolk/Ovington

Breckland District
Villages in Norfolk
Civil parishes in Norfolk